Lee San-San (born 9 October 1977, was the winner of the 1996 Miss Hong Kong Pageant and her territory's representative at Miss Universe 1997. Lee placed 45th at that pageant like former Miss Hong Kongs, Mok Hoi Yan and Halina Tam. She also competed at the Miss Chinese International 1997, pageant where she finished 2nd. She signed with TVB, and starred in various Hong Kong television dramas, before leaving the network. She is a Hakka of Meixian ancestry.

Television
 Untraceable Evidence (1997)
 Burning Flame (1998)
 Detective Investigation Files IV (1999)
 Untraceable Evidence 2 (1999)
 Man's Best Friend (1999)
 Aiming High (2000)
 The Monkey King: Quest for the Sutra (2002)
 The Unbeatables 3 (2002) as Jiang Yexue

References

External links
 
 HK cinemagic entry

1977 births
Hong Kong people of Hakka descent
Living people
Miss Hong Kong winners
Miss Universe 1997 contestants
People from Meixian District